The A105 road is an A road in London, England. It runs from Canonbury, in between Highbury and Dalston, to Enfield Town. Part of the road forms Green Lanes, one of the longest streets in London, while the A105 also serves as the primary access route to the Shopping City shopping centre in Wood Green.

The road originally continued north from Enfield Town through Forty Hill and Bulls Cross, crossing the A10 to the A1010 at Bullsmoor to the south of Waltham Cross. The section between Enfield Town and the A10 is now unclassified. The northernmost section has since been extended eastwards to become part of the A1055.

References

 

Roads in England
Streets in the London Borough of Enfield
Streets in the London Borough of Hackney
Streets in the London Borough of Haringey
Streets in the London Borough of Islington